Muller Conrad "Billy" Rautenbach (born 23 September 1959) is a Zimbabwean business magnate, whose more than 150 ventures have included companies involved in transport, cobalt and platinum mining, and biofuel production, primarily in Africa. The 2022 Data Leaks at Credit Suisse appeared to confirm allegations – for which he had faced American and European sanctions in earlier years – that Rautenbach used the proceeds from a mining deal to support the ZANU-PF regime of dictator Robert Mugabe, during the latter's repressive 2008 election campaign in Zimbabwe. From 1999 to 2009, Rautenbach was a fugitive from fraud and corruption charges in South Africa.

Early life
	
Rautenbach was born Muller Conrad Rautenbach in 1959 in what was then Salisbury, Rhodesia. He inherited a Rhodesia-based trucking company from his father, Wessels, and his rise in business began in earnest when he moved to Johannesburg, South Africa.

Career

Business ventures
Rautenbach's first venture was the expansion of his father's transport company, Wheels of Africa. The company became a significant player in southern Africa, with the Financial Mail estimating that it controlled 75% of the Zimbabwean haulage market in 1999. Wheels of Africa also expanded into car assembly and distribution – Rautenbach held a 50% stake in Hyundai's operations in South Africa and Botswana, and owning the Volvo heavy vehicle franchise in thirteen African countries, which eventually let to upsetting the South African motoring market by growing the market share of Hyundai. He also had business interests in construction, land, and mining.

Rautenbach's flight from fraud and corruption charges in South Africa in late 1999  coincided with the financial collapse of several of his southern African business interests. By February 2000, several companies in the Wheels of Africa group had been liquidated, leaving significant debts in southern Africa. Rautenbach did not return to South Africa until 2009, when he reached a R40 million plea agreement with prosecutors. During this time, Rautenbach continued to support the South African economy with a procurement spend of R415-million (an average of US$1 million / R8 million per week over a period of one year) through mining activities.

Mining activities 
In the late 1990s, Rautenbach became involved in mining ventures in the Democratic Republic of Congo (DRC). In 1998, DRC President Laurent-Désiré Kabila appointed him chief executive of the state-owned mining company, Gécamines. Prior to his appointment, Wheels of Africa had held transport contracts with Gécamines, and Rautenbach's company, Ridgepointe Overseas Development Ltd, had successfully managed at least three of its copper and cobalt mines, increasing their revenue. He was removed as Gécamines chief executive – apparently acrimoniously – in 2000, and his Congolese assets were seized.

Rautenbach controlled Boss Mining Ltd, which held the rights to half of the Mukondo mine and to two other mining concessions in the Katanga province of the DRC. In February 2006, he became a major shareholder in the Central African Mining and Exploration Company (Camec), receiving a 17% share when it acquired those mining rights. He owned 8% of Camec shares as of July 2007, and reportedly made an estimated $50 million from the 2009 sale of Camec to the Eurasian Natural Resources Corporation. Yet by 2007, Rautenbach was again an unpopular figure among some DRC politicians. Camec had been building a stake in Katanga Mining, but faced government opposition at least partly due to the involvement of Rautenbach, who at the time was wanted for fraud by the South African authorities. In July 2007, Rautenbach was detained in Katanga and deported to Zimbabwe. Moise Katumbi, governor of Katanga, said, "Even if we have as yet no extradition facilities in place, we will not continue to allow such people to operate in the DRC with impunity."

Success in mining 

His success in mining was due to his father’s trucking business contacts in transporting minerals and his use of innovative mining techniques. With the eye of an outsider, he developed a different technique and out-mined the state company in a very short period of time: “We did it very selectively. We slowed down the process and picked it out in very high grade and with very little investment.” Billy's unorthodox approach was highly successful, and showed up the massive inefficiency of the state-run enterprises. In 1998, Laurent Kabila offered Billy a chance to lead state-owned Gecamines, which despite his initial reluctance, he finally accepted, and in doing so successfully turned around the fortune of the company by cutting costs and improving efficiencies. However, the rebel-infested country began to create trouble for the Congolese government who, in search for funds, issued allegations of misappropriation of corporate assets. Rautenbach was also accused of financing the DRC war, allegations which he denied, logically stating that he was in business in the Congo long before the war broke out: “I started mining in the Congo about a year before the war started. So all of a sudden, the war is there because of me. It's unbelievable.” “We were very active there in getting the production going, in turning around things. We were possibly affecting people's commercial interests ... I set up a little mine there, and out-produced the major cobalt producers in the world in one year. They spend billions of dollars putting up a plant and I come there as a farmer – me and my dad – and we got the stuff out of the ground.”

CAMEC's sustainable development activities 

In favour of sustainable development, Rautenbach saw to it that CAMEC created employment for over 5,000 people at its Luita plant. At an average of five people per household, 25,000 people were sustained as a result of this operation. The operation also saw the completion of an expatriate staff village of 3000 people – fondly known as Billyville by employees and contractors – with over 200 houses, recreation facilities, staffing hostels, and a 2000m2 office complex. Moreover, millions of dollars were ploughed back into the DRC to uplift the communities surrounding CAMEC’s operations. These projects included renovations to a clinic, the provision of necessary medical equipment, and the construction of a crèche and primary school. Construction also included a technical college to educate 3,600 children in the skills needed at the processing plant, such as mechanics, electronics and welding to help alleviate the skills shortages in the DRC. 

Further civil society initiatives included the reconstructing of local infrastructure, i.e. a 80km national road between Kolwezi and Likasi previously damaged by floods more than 15 years ago; power lines of 23,4km from the town of Fungurume to Luita, and a state of the art water treatment system providing 40,000 litres of drinkable water per day constructed in an area previously known for cholera. The company also notably commissioned and built two dams of 50,000m3 and 1,5 million3 litres respectively. CAMEC’s mining and production operation at Luita also helped create business opportunities for local contractors, such as brick making plants.

Green Fuel Investments 

Green Fuel is a joint venture between the Zimbabwean Agricultural and Rural Development Authority (Arda) and investment vehicles controlled by Rautenbach, which signed a 20-year contract with the Zimbabwean government in February 2009. In 2011, Green Fuel built a $600-million ethanol fuel plant on land leased from Arda in Chisumbanje in the sugar-growing Chipinge district of Zimbabwe. By 2015, Green Fuel's acreage had expanded from 5,112 hectares to 9,375 hectares. As of 2021, Arda had 10% stake in Green Fuel, and Rautenbach was the majority partner.

Benefits to the Zimbabwean economy 
The Chisumbanje plant was completed in 18 months with the design and a number of aspects of the plant imported from Brazil. However, over 60% of the plant was manufactured by local engineers in Zimbabwe, under the supervision of experts from Brazil. As of 2022 the project was the largest of its type in Africa. 

Zimbabwean regulations make it mandatory to blend unleaded fuel with a government-prescribed proportion of ethanol. Upon completion of the project, between 2,5 million and 2,8 million litres of ethanol are estimated to be produced daily. The production of such volumes of ethanol is expected to end the country’s importation of petrol, as fuel blended with 10 percent locally-made eco-friendly ethanol is sold at a lower cost than fuel that is fully imported and is a boon for motorists. 

Green Fuel pumped out about 10 percent of Zimbabwe’s fuel needs within a few months and excess ethanol-petrol is exported, bringing much-needed foreign currency for social and economic development to the country. Consequently, Green Fuel has not only increased Zimbabwe's energy security, but it has also lessened dependence on foreign, imported oil and fossil fuels in the future. 

With daily power cuts of over 18 hours in recent years in Zimbabwe, Green Fuel generates 18 megawatts from burning waste which can power about 18,000 homes. The project is reducing Zimbabwe’s spending on fuel imports by roughly $40 million a year. Nearly one-tenth of the government’s 2019 budget for imported fuel. setting a record for Zimbabwe as being the first African country with flexi fuel vehicle technology using blends of up to 85% ethanol and reducing the country’s fuel import bill, the project created over 4,500 jobs in Zimbabwe  and moved the country towards a greener economy.

In sum, by contributing to the production of ethanol based fuel, Green Fuel has helped the country to save at least $2 million every month in fuel imports. and was awarded National Project Status by the Government of Zimbabwe due to the significant benefits it will bring to the country. Currently, the IMF predicts a 6% GDP growth for Zimbabwe, reflecting agricultural output and an increased energy production,

Opposition parties to the current government have criticised the project, stating that the ruling party has effectively created a monopoly for Green Fuel, which as of 2021 was the only company licensed to produce ethanol for blending purposes in Zimbabwe. Member of Parliament Allan Markham, who challenged the mandatory blending regulations in court, also put forward unfounded arguments that they result in high fuel prices.

Creation of jobs 
The project, possibly Africa’s largest eco-project to date, has created more jobs in Zimbabwe than any other in the last 20 years. 

Besides currently supplying irrigation for the first time to peasant farmers working in dry areas around the sugar cane fields, it is foreseen that the venture will continue to create employment for more than 8000 people. Already, the venture is spending nearly $2,000,000 every month in salaries alone for 120 full-time employees and hundreds of contract workers from villages around the ARDA estates, transforming the lives of people in Chisumbanje, including others at growth points such as Checheche and in towns further away, such as Chipinge and Chiredzi. 

Zimbabwe does not have personnel experienced in ethanol plant construction work and through job training programmes, Green Fuel has created a set of skilled ethanol plant artisans marketable worldwide, thereby empowering the local people through technological transfer. 

Moreover, the planned construction of the Kondo Dam for increased water volumes required along the Save River will create more jobs for the rural populace. Further to this, a steel fabricating unit has been established in Harare with a staff establishment of over 100 artisans involved in the manufacture of a range of parts required for the ethanol project. Thirteen Local commuter bus companies in Chipinge have been contracted to ferry labour from the villages to the project site on a daily basis. More importantly, 30% of the artisans employed in the distillery and boiler sections of the ethanol plant are Zimbabweans previously based outside the country in South Africa, Swaziland and Mozambique. Community leaders in Chisumbanje said they are fully behind the project as it will uplift their livelihoods, "We really support the project as we are the first beneficiary in the sense that development will be realized in our once-marginalized area. We shall benefit economically, infrastructural and even socially,” said one community leader.

Community irrigation construction and rehabilitation 
Chipinge district, particularly Chipinge South where the factory is located, has a very harsh climate characterised by very low rainful and high temperatures. As such, it was considered one of the least developed areas in Zimbabwe prior to the project. Once Green Fuel signed the deal with ARDA to take over and rehabilitate its collapsed sugar cane estates, a massive reconstruction of the area was undertaken to expand the irrigation system with the aim to plant and irrigate at least 50,000 hectares of sugar cane to produce two million liters of ethanol a day. The refinery was partly imported from Brazil, with some parts manufactured in Harare and a team of experts from Brazil and Mauritius overseeing the project. 

Green fuel has resolved to develop 10% of all the land it develops for the benefit of the community in the form of irrigated plots. and is thus supplying water for the first time to rural farmers for all year round farming needs in an effort to counter the devastating impact of years of poverty-inducing drought. At Chisumbanje, a 4000 hectare new irrigation scheme was developed for communal farming. 

This programme targets individual farmers keen on growing and supplying sugarcane for the mill. These farmers are supplied with all the technical assistance in the form of land preparation for 10 hectares and inputs, the costs of which are deductable from their total sales after harvesting. To date, approximately 1,100 hectares of land have been developed for the community at a cost of approximately $11 million to the company, 700 farmers have been allocated new irrigation plots of 650 hectares with packages of input to kick start their operations. The company provides these farmers with consistent support and assistance. 

The remaining 500ha consists of irrigated plots, measuring 0.5ha each and benefitting 1,000 families. The water is pumped all year at the cost of the company, ensuring consistent availability of water in an area that receives very little rainfall and, as a result, each farmer can produce up to three cash crops per year. 

The project is in the process of developing a further 380ha of irrigation schemes for the Chisumbanje community which will benefit a further 760 farmers. At project completion, the number of farmers on irrigated land will peak at 8000 plot holders. 
Currently, up to US$2 million is injected into Chipinge South every month in the form of salaries and procurement finance, which has resulted in significantly increased commercial traffic. 

Banks and cell phone towers have opened in Checheche – a growth point neighbouring Chisumbanje – that has since been granted town status due to the ethanol project. Local businesses are prospering and social services, such as healthcare facilities, roads, churches and schools are being refurbished and revived by Green Fuel. 

Moreover, a ‘community irrigation schemes water engineering department’ has been created at Middle Sabi ensuring the day-to-day needs of the schemes in terms of water conveyance.

The Sabi River and a functional irrigation system is now the lifeline of the area. In particular, eighteen existing small-scale irrigation schemes have been rehabilitated, stretching 1,700 hectares from Mutema and Tawona to Chibuwe, and catering for approximately 2,300 farmers. The rehabilitation work centred on repairing and replacing water pumps, drilling additional boreholes to augment water supplies and the reconstruction of water conveyance systems. Currently, a number of farmers have taken up contract farming in bananas for Matanuska and are doing extremely well.

Despite these positive outcomes, and is often the case for all major large-scale public works, the project has attracted criticism. Some of the most ardent critics have, however, since realized that the yield in one acre supported by drip irrigation realizes higher yields. There is now a huge demand for these irrigation schemes. (see section: Creation of jobs) Moreover, repeated monitoring visits by officials from the Zimbabwean government, the World Bank and the United Nations Industrial Development Organization qualified the industrial development as necessary for the poverty stricken district, thereby making it clear that it is in the public’s general interest that the project continue, especially after two decades of economic turmoil that has starved Zimbabwe of foreign currency, and created fuel shortages.

Refurbishment of social service institutions 
Green Fuel has completed rehabilitative works on key public service facilities which include schools, roads, hospitals and health centers. Work has been completed in this direction with initial focus on educational facilities on both estates and the major health referral centre closest to Chisumbanje, St Peters Hospital at Checheche, with constructive repairs and additional capacity through the construction of new structures to cater for the swelling service demand created by the volumes of staff on site.

Environmental protection 
The fuel and electricity that Green fuel provides is a environmentally friendly and sustainable. It reduces air pollution and decreases greenhouse gas emissions by over 60%. Currently, as talks of climate change gather momentum, Zimbabwe has joined Brazil and China to discuss how their carbon footprints through investment into ethanol can be reduced.

Controversies

Fraud and corruption charges in South Africa 
In November 1999, after investigating Rautenbach for about two years, South African law enforcement conducted a raid on Rautenbach's Johannesburg home and private aircraft, as well as the Johannesburg offices of Wheels of Africa. Following the raid, and amid financial strain in his southern African business interests, Rautenbach fled South Africa. On 19 September 2000, Rautenbach's South African assets, worth at least R40 million, were seized by the National Prosecuting Authority (NPA). He faced charges for crimes he had allegedly committed while at Hyundai, including numerous counts of fraud and theft. In March 2007, South African authorities filed for his extradition from Zimbabwe. On 18 September 2009, Rautenbach handed himself over to the NPA. Charged with 326 counts of fraud, he pleaded guilty on behalf of one of his companies, SA Botswana Hauliers, and, in a plea bargain, agreed to pay a fine of R40 million in exchange for the withdrawal of the charges against him, having continued to deny personal liability.

Death of Yong Koo Kwon 
Rautenbach launched a legal challenge against the validity of the 1999 raids, and of the evidence seized in the process, with the Constitutional Court ultimately ruling against him. In court papers, the state claimed that Rautenbach was linked to the murder of Yong Koo Kwon of Daewoo Motors, who had been shot dead in his car in Johannesburg in February 1999. Rautenbach emphatically denied any involvement in the murder, and described the allegations as a "witch-hunt." No charges were ever laid against Rautenbach, and three other men were charged with the murder in 2006.

Corruption trial of Jackie Selebi 
Two months after striking the 2009 plea bargain with the NPA, Rautenberg testified for the prosecution in the corruption trial of Jackie Selebi, National Commissioner of the South African Police Service. Selebi was accused of accepting bribes from Rautenbach and two other businessmen. During the trial, convicted drug smuggler Glen Agliotti testified that Selebi had been asked to intervene in NPA and South African Revenue Service investigations into Rautenbach, to cancel Rautenbach's arrest warrant, and to provide information about whether Rautenbach was wanted by Interpol, of which Selebi was president. Agliotti said, and Rautenbach confirmed, that Rautenbach paid $100 000 to Agliotti, who channelled $30 000 to Selebi.

Alleged ties to ZANU-PF in Zimbabwe 
Critics alleged that Rautenbach had been appointed to Gécamines, the Congolese state-owned mining company, at the request of the Zimbabwean ruling party, ZANU-PF – indeed, in 1999 the Guardian called the existence of such an arrangement "a widespread assumption in diplomatic circles." The allegation, as made by a United Nations panel in 2001, was that Rautenbach had been appointed to Gécamines to help channel mining profits from the DRC to the ZANU-PF regime, in exchange for Zimbabwean military support for Kabila's forces in the Second Congo War. He was reportedly an associate of ZANU-PF government minister Emmerson Mnangagwa, who became president in 2018. In 1999, Rautenbach denied the allegations, saying that he had never met Robert Mugabe.

In 2008, Camec was involved in a controversial deal, in which, through the purchase of another company, it provided a $100 million payment – referred to as a loan – in exchange for the acquisition of Zimbabwean platinum assets, previously owned by Anglo American Platinum, which the Zimbabwean government had taken control of. The payment was financed with capital raised primarily from the American hedge fund Och-Ziff, and was reportedly used by ZANU-PF to fund its repressive 2008 election campaign. Shortly afterwards, in October 2008, the American embassy in Zimbabwe investigated Rautenbach for his involvement in off-the-book sales of vehicles to the Zimbabwean government.

In November 2008, the United States Treasury Department designated Rautenbach – and a company he controlled, Ridgepointe Overseas Development Ltd – for sanctions, calling him one of the Mugabe regime's "cronies" and claiming that he had provided Mugabe with support which had enabled the latter to pursue anti-democratic policies. The sanctions remained in place until April 2014. Rautenbach was also subject to targeted European Union sanctions, from January 2009 until February 2012, for his alleged association with the ZANU-PF regime.

Suisse Secrets 
The 2022 Data Leaks at Credit Suisse appeared to confirm earlier allegations that Rautenbach had supported the Mugabe regime's campaign during the 2008 Zimbabwean elections. Credit Suisse opened two accounts for Rautenbach weeks before a mining deal that funnelled $100 million to Mugabe’s government, reportedly used to incite violence that helped Mugabe win the election. Rautenbach was able to sell his shares from the deal for a huge profit, but the mine was left undeveloped for over a decade.

Green Fuel

Alleged corruption 
In 2014, Temba Mliswa, the provincial chairperson for Zanu-PF in Mashonaland West and a Member of the Zimbabwean Parliament, accused Rautenbach of bribing Arda board chairperson Basil Nyabadza, claiming that he had bought Nyabadza a house in exchange for preferential treatment. Nyabadza denied the allegations, and Rautenbach called Mliswa – who at the time was demanding millions of dollars he claimed Rautenbach owed him for investment consulting services – an "extortionist." In 2019, Mliswa made various further accusations about Rautenbach's ventures in Zimbabwe and connections to the Zimbabwean government.

Land and other disputes 
According to amaBhungane, local activists claim that Green Fuel has encroached on communal land in Chipinge, displacing thousands of families, without sufficient compensation. They also claim that the firm has polluted the water, bulldozed maize fields to build a road, and failed to honour its promises to pay sugarcane growers $4 a tonne. Chipinge residents, supported by non-profit Zimbabwe Lawyers for Human Rights, are challenging Green Fuel's claim to the land in the courts. A 2015 report by the Zimbabwean Parliament's Portfolio Committee on Youth, Indigenisation and Economic Empowerment echoed many of these accusations, and concluded that the project was against the country's indigenisation laws. It also learned from the Environmental Management Agency that Green Fuel had not conducted a full environmental impact assessment study, as required by legislation, before initiating the project.

Green Fuel has denied the accusations, saying that, through its corporate social responsibility programme, Vimbo, it has spent millions of dollars on developing the neighbouring villages, and provided irrigation, electricity, and stock feed to villagers. It has committed to develop as irrigation schemes 10% of all land put under sugar cane, and, in 2021, it unveiled one such scheme, among the biggest in the country, in Chisumbanje, under which it provided drip irrigation equipment and plots to villagers. The company has also denied claims that the plant's effluent is a pollutant. Nyabadza of the Arda board said in 2015 that the project was justified on the grounds that it would reduce Zimbabwe's import bill. Indeed, according to Bloomberg, the project reduces Zimbabwe's spending on fuel imports by about one-tenth, or $40 million, per year. Voice of America reported in 2011 that it had created 4,500 jobs, "more jobs... than any other [project] in the last 20 years"; by 2021, it employed about 3,000 people.

In July 2021, several Zimbabwean newspapers reported that Green Fuel security guards had razed crops and destroyed houses in Chinyamukwakwa, Chipinge, affecting thousands of villagers, in order to facilitate Green Fuel's expansion in the area. According to the headman of the village, thousands of displaced residents of Chipinge were resettling in neighbouring Mozambique. Rautenbach and Green Fuel have also been involved in disputes with the Nuanetsi Ranch board over land on Nuanetsi Ranch on the Mwenezi River, to which Rautenbach first gained access in 2009.

Pandora Papers 
As reported by amaBhungane in the Daily Maverick, Rautenbach was named in the 2021 Pandora Papers leak. The leak provided evidence of a complex offshore family trust fund, begun in 2013 when Rautenbach, while still under American sanctions, donated multimillion-dollar investments in his coal and ethanol businesses to his wife. The fund is held in Rautenbach's wife's name, but in leaked documents financial advisors identified Rautenbach as the "effective controller" of the fund.

Personal life

In his youth, Rautenbach pursued rally racing, a pursuit taken up by his son Conrad. As of 2006 Rautenbach spent his time on his farm with his family on the outskirts of Harare, pursuing natural land conservation.

References

1959 births
Living people
Zimbabwean businesspeople
Zimbabwean rally drivers
White Zimbabwean businesspeople
White Zimbabwean sportspeople
White Rhodesian people